Sant Climenç is a locality located in the municipality of Pinell de Solsonès, in Province of Lleida province, Catalonia, Spain. As of 2020, it has a population of 97. Sant Climenç is the capital of the municipality of Pinell de Solsonès.

Geography 
Sant Climenç is located 102km east-northeast of Lleida.

References

Populated places in the Province of Lleida